Charlestown is a census-designated place (CDP) in Washington County, Rhode Island, United States, comprising the main village in the town of Charlestown and additional land extending to the east into the town of South Kingstown. It was first listed as a CDP prior to the 2020 census.

Charlestown is in southern Washington County, on the north side of Ninigret Pond, a tidal lagoon connected to Block Island Sound. The community is in the southeast part of the town of Charlestown and the southwest part of the town of South Kingstown. The village of Charlestown is in the northwest part of the CDP, at the northern head of Ninigret Pond. The hamlet of Charlestown Beach is in the southern part of the CDP, separated by a tidal inlet from the physical Charlestown Beach along the Atlantic. The CDP continues east into South Kingstown, on the north side of Green Hill Pond.

U.S. Route 1 forms the northern edge of the Charlestown CDP; the highway leads northeast  to Narragansett and west  to Westerly.

Demographics

References 

Census-designated places in Washington County, Rhode Island
Census-designated places in Rhode Island